The 1991 Paris–Nice was the 49th edition of the Paris–Nice cycle race and was held from 10 March to 17 March 1991. The race started in Fontenay-sous-Bois and finished at the Col d'Èze. The race was won by Tony Rominger of the Toshiba team.

Route

General classification

References

1991
March 1991 sports events in Europe
1991 in road cycling
1991 in French sport